Luis Miguel Loro Santiago (born 4 September 1979 in Fuenlabrada, Madrid), known as Luismi, is a Spanish former professional footballer who played as a forward.

References

External links

1979 births
Living people
People from Fuenlabrada
Spanish footballers
Footballers from the Community of Madrid
Association football forwards
Segunda División players
Segunda División B players
CF Fuenlabrada footballers
Atlético Levante UD players
Levante UD footballers
UB Conquense footballers
Novelda CF players
FC Cartagena footballers
Logroñés CF footballers
Benidorm CF footballers
CD Castellón footballers
Elche CF players
CD Tenerife players
Huracán Valencia CF players
CD Olímpic de Xàtiva footballers